Taylor McKincee Hoagland (born June 9, 1991) is an American, former collegiate All-American, right-handed hitting softball player originally from Flower Mound, Texas. She attended Flower Mound High School and later attended the University of Texas at Austin, where she was a third baseman for the Texas Longhorns softball team. She owns Texas softball's longest hitting streak, and is the program's all-time leader in home runs. In her senior year, Hoagland led Texas softball to a berth in the 2013 Women's College World Series semifinals, where they lost to Tennessee, 2–0. Hoagland later went on to represent the United States internationally, playing on the United States women's national softball team.

Statistics

Texas Longhorns

References

External links
 
Texas bio
USA Softball Bio

1991 births
Softball players from Texas
Texas Longhorns softball players
Living people
People from Lewisville, Texas
Softball players at the 2011 Pan American Games
Pan American Games gold medalists for the United States
Pan American Games medalists in softball
Medalists at the 2011 Pan American Games